Gephi is an open-source network analysis and visualization software package written in Java on the NetBeans platform.

History
Initially developed by students of the University of Technology of Compiègne (UTC) in France, Gephi has been selected for the Google Summer of Code in 2009, 2010, 2011, 2012, and 2013.

Its last version, 0.10.1 has been launched in 2023. Previous versions are 0.6.0 (2008), 0.7.0 (2010), 0.8.0 (2011), 0.8.1 (2012), 0.8.2 (2013), 0.9.0 (2015), 0.9.1 (2016) and 0.9.2 (2017).

The Gephi Consortium, created in 2010, is a French non-profit corporation which supports development of future releases of Gephi. Members include SciencesPo, Linkfluence, WebAtlas, and Quid. Gephi is also supported by a large community of users, structured on a discussion group and a forum and producing numerous blogposts, papers and tutorials.

Applications
Gephi has been used in a number of research projects in academia, journalism and elsewhere, for instance in visualizing the global connectivity of New York Times content and examining Twitter network traffic during social unrest along with more traditional network analysis topics. Gephi is widely used within the digital humanities (in history, literature, political sciences, etc.), a community where many of its developers are involved.

Gephi inspired the LinkedIn InMaps and was used for the network visualizations for Truthy.

See also 

 Graph (discrete mathematics)
 Graph drawing
 Graph theory
 Graph (data structure)
 Social network analysis software
 File formats
 Dot language
 GraphML
 Graph Modelling Language

 Related software

 Cytoscape
 Graph-tool
 Graphviz
 Tulip (software)
 yEd
AllegroGraph
NetworkX
NodeXL
Pajek
NetMiner

References

External links 
 
Gephi releases
Gephi wiki

2000 software
Network theory

Free application software
Graph drawing software
Free data visualization software